Max Emil Fredrik Lööf (born 13 December 1969 in Kristinehamn, Sweden) is a Swedish professional sailor who has participated in six Summer Olympics, winning one gold and two bronze medals. He won the gold medal in Star with Max Salminen at the 2012 Summer Olympics and the bronze medals in Finn in the 2000 Summer Olympics and with Anders Ekström in Star in the 2008 Summer Olympics.

Biography
Fredrik Lööf was born in Kristinehamn close to Vänern on 13 December 1969. He started sailing the Optimist and started racing in the Optimist class at age eight and then continued to the Europe and OK classes.

In 1988, Lööf started sailing Finn to qualify for the 1992 Summer Olympics. He finished fifth in Finn in the 1992 Summer Olympics and the 1996 Summer Olympics. In 2000, he won a bronze medal at the 2000 Summer Olympics. In addition he won three Finn World Championships and finished on the podium another four times.

After the 2000 Olympics, he moved on to the Star class. In the 2004 Summer Olympics, he finished 12th with Anders Ekström in Star. He continued in the class together with Ekström and won the bronze medal at the 2008 Summer Olympics.

In the 2012 Summer Olympics, Lööf sailed together with Max Salminen in the Star class, the team was created and coached by Italian Michele Marchesini. The team were making good results and on the day of the Medal race, the three medallist boats were decided with the Lööf/Salminen crew as potential bronze medallists. In the decisive race Lööf and Salminen made a good effort, while the other boats helmed by Iain Percy and Robert Scheidt were guarding each other. As winners of the Medal race, the Swedish team moved to the first place in the result list and became Olympic champions in the Star class.

Lööf was among the 2012 Summer Olympics closing ceremony flag bearers, holding the Swedish flag.

Lööf has also won two World Championships in Star, in 2001 and 2004, and finished second once, in 2003. He has won the European Championships in Star three times, and finished on the podium another three times.

In 2001–02, he was a crewmember on yacht AMER SPORTS ONE and in 2005–06 on yacht Pirates of the Caribbean in the Volvo Ocean Race.

Achievements

References

External links

 
 
 
 

1969 births
Olympic sailors of Sweden
Swedish male sailors (sport)
Olympic gold medalists for Sweden
Olympic bronze medalists for Sweden
Sailors at the 1992 Summer Olympics – Finn
Sailors at the 1996 Summer Olympics – Finn
Sailors at the 2000 Summer Olympics – Finn
Sailors at the 2004 Summer Olympics – Star
Sailors at the 2008 Summer Olympics – Star
Sailors at the 2012 Summer Olympics – Star
Living people
Olympic medalists in sailing
Star class world champions
Medalists at the 2012 Summer Olympics
Medalists at the 2008 Summer Olympics
Royal Swedish Yacht Club sailors
Kristinehamns Kanotseglare sailors
Volvo Ocean Race sailors
OK class sailors
6 Metre class sailors
Etchells class sailors
Melges 24 class sailors
Melges 32 class sailors
Medalists at the 2000 Summer Olympics
Finn class world champions
World champions in sailing for Sweden
People from Kristinehamn
Sportspeople from Värmland County